Carl Wilhelm Erich Zimmer (Sondershausen, 29 September 1873 – Hüll bei Wolnzach, 8 November 1950) was a German zoologist specialising in crustaceans, especially the order Cumacea.

He studied zoology at the universities of Strasbourg, Munich and Breslau, receiving his doctorate in 1897. In 1912 he was appointed second director at the Zoological State Collection of Munich, where in 1917 he became director. From 1924 to 1937 he was a full professor and director of the zoological museum in Berlin.

The crustacean genus Zimmeriana (Hale, 1946; family Gynodiastylidae) commemorates his name, as do species with the epithet of zimmeri, including three species of frogs (Arthroleptis zimmeri, Oreophryne zimmeri, and Pseudophilautus zimmeri) and a species of lizard (Sphenomorphus zimmeri). He is the taxonomic authority for the krill species Euphausia hanseni.

Selected publications
Die Cumaceen der "Deutschen Tiefsee-Expedition", 1908 – Cumacea from the German Deepsea-Expedition. (in German).
Südwestafrikanische Schizopoden, 1912 – Southwest African Schizopoda. (in German).
Untersuchungen an diastyliden (Ordnung Cumacea), 1930 – Research of Diastylidae (order Cumacea). (in German).
"California Crustacea of the order Cumacea"; translated into English, 1937.
Cumacea, 1941.
"Cumaceans of the American Atlantic boreal coast region (Crustacea, Peracarida)"; translated into English, 1979.

References

20th-century German zoologists
German carcinologists
1873 births
1950 deaths
People from Sondershausen
Academic staff of the Humboldt University of Berlin
University of Breslau alumni